The Lock Haven Bald Eagles are the intercollegiate sports teams of Lock Haven University of Pennsylvania, located in Lock Haven, Pennsylvania. LHU participates in NCAA Division II as a member of the Pennsylvania State Athletic Conference (PSAC) for most sports. Field hockey and wrestling participate in NCAA Division I as members of the Atlantic 10 Conference and Mid-American Conference (MAC) respectively.

On Saturday, September 29, 2012, Lock Haven lost to the Shippensburg Raiders by a score of 49-6.  With the loss Lock Haven took sole possession of the all-time NCAA Division II Football consecutive losing streak record at 47 games, with their last win occurring on November 3, 2007.  The previous record of 46 was held by the Minnesota-Morris Cougars (who have since reclassified to Division III); that streak ran from November 14, 1998 - September 20, 2003. On November 10, 2012, the Lock Haven Bald Eagles defeated the Cheyney Wolves by a score of 15–7, ending their record losing streak at 52 games.

Sports

Men's sports
 Baseball
 Basketball
 Cross Country
 Football
 Soccer
 Track and field (indoor and outdoor)
 Wrestling

Women's sports
 Basketball
 Cross Country
 Field Hockey
 Golf (beginning 2020-21)
 Lacrosse
 Soccer
 Softball
 Swimming
 Tennis (beginning 2019-20)
 Track and field (indoor and outdoor)
 Volleyball
 Wrestling (beginning 2019-20)

Championships 
Team National Championships:

Individual National Championships:

References

External links